Mohammed Umar Bago (born 22 February 1974) is a Nigerian politician. He was born in Minna, Niger State, to a Nupe family, He is a member of parliament for Chanchaga, Federal Constituency. He stands with the APC Party. He ran in the 9th National Assembly, contesting for Speaker House of Representatives of Nigeria. He came second to Femi Gbajabiamila. Mohammed Bago emerges APC governorship candidate in Niger for the upcoming 2023 general election.

Early life and education
Born in 1974, Umar Bago attended Marafa Primary School, Minna and Federal Government College, Jos. He earned his West Africa School Certificate from the WAEC. He earned a bachelor's degree in political science at Usman Danfodio University, Sokoto.

Bago has obtained several postgraduate diplomas and master's degrees, including a postgraduate diploma in management from the Federal University of Technology Minna in 2001, a Master of Business Administration (MBA) in economics at the Ambrose Ali University, Ekpoma, in 2003, and a master's degree in finance at University of Calabar in 2005. He is also a distinguished alumnus from Cambridge University in the United Kingdom in 2014.

Career 
Bago worked with the United Bank for Africa (UBA), First City Monument Bank (FCMB) and Afri-Bank PLC respectively. He serves as manager at First City Monument Bank. In 2007 he entered politics.

He stated, "I won't back down, I just want to correct the mistake of the party leaders by opinion of zonings."

He chairs the House Committee on Maritime Safety, Education and Administration. In 2016 he advised the management of the Maritime Commission that 83 staff should be sacked. He stated, "That is how touts are employed." He urged the Nimasa to spend money wisely in a well and prepared process. He won the APC gubernatorial primary elections in Niger state ahead of the 2023 general elections.
Winner 2023 Governorship Election (Niger State)

Personal life and philanthropy
Bago is married with children. His mother, Hajiya Aisha Mohammed, died on 1 June 2019 after a brief illness.

To improve the educational quality of his constituency, he bought 1000 forms of JAMB to his people. And also distributed 11 trailer loads of rice to his constituency as a palliative during Covid-19 pandemic period.

See also 
All Progressive Congress

Niger State

National Assembly

NIMASA

References

1972 births
Members of the House of Representatives (Nigeria)
Nigerian bankers
Living people
Action Congress of Nigeria politicians
People from Niger State
University of Jos alumni
Nupe